Laku noć, Hrvatska (Good night, Croatia) is a Croatian adult animated series produced by Croatia Film of Zagreb. It debuted in February 2005 on Nova TV and was shown on the station daily until the end of the year. In 2006, it showed up on Jabuka TV. The entire series is also available on 4 DVDs.

Laku noć, Hrvatska is a parody of Croatian TV news and other TV shows. Every episode has three basic parts: news, sport and weather. It satirically makes fun of Croatian and other world politicians. It also features animated commercials during the course of an episode.

There were 252 episodes of the show. On weekdays episodes were 10 minutes long, while those shown on weekends were 25 minutes long.

Voice actors
Duško Modrinić as Denis Latin, Ivo Sanader, Ivica Račan, Neven Ciganović, Zdravko Mamić, Petar Čobanković, Slavko Linić, Siniša Svilan, Zoran Vakula, Zoran Milanović, Berislav Rončević, Tony Blair, Igor Štimac, Denis Kuljiš, Božidar Kalmeta, Tomislav Karamarko, Gordan Jandroković, Božo Biškupić, Mišo Kovač, Oliver Mlakar, Stipe Petrina, Zlatko Sudac, Vladimir Drobnjak, Željko Kerum, Ivan Gudelj, Damir Bajs, Boris Mikšić (dialogue), Milorad Pupovac (dialogue), Vlado Gotovac, Tonči Huljić, Mladen Stubljar, Luka Bebić, Mladen Grdović, Mato Arlović, Mirko Galić, Petar Vlahov, Mario Salvador, Tiho Orlić, Julius Caesar, Joško Vlašić, Karl Marx, Filip Medić, Janica Kostelić and others
Jerko Marčić as Goran Milić, Miroslav Ćiro Blažević, Božo Sušec, Milan Bandić (dialogue), Marina Matulović-Dropulić, Carla del Ponte (dialogue), Ivan Zvonimir Čičak, Duško Ljuština, Vlatka Pokos (dialogue), Winston Churchill, Gandhi, Miroslav Škoro, Jacques Houdek, Siniša Vuco, Dinko Bogdanić, Veljko Bulajić, Zoran Krivić, Vedran Benić, Slobodan Milošević, Marino Strmo, Dubravka Šuica, Vedran Ćorluka and others
Marija Borić as Jadranka Kosor, Pamela Anderson, Renata Sopek, Mirjana Hrga, Ksenija Marinković and others
Luka Juričić as Flying Reporter, Mićo Dušanović, Kolinda Grabar-Kitarović, Đurđa Adlešič, Vedrana Rudan, Dijana Čuljak, Zlatko Kramarić, Sanja Doležal, Blanka Vlašić, Ingrid Antičević-Marinović, Elizabeta Gojan, Hillary Clinton and others
Vladimir Šagadin as Anto Đapić, Miljenko Jergović, Silvija Luks and others
Joško Ševo as Stipe Mesić, Josip Broz Tito and others
Nina Kaić as additional voices
Ana Maras as Severina Kojić (season 3)
Jelena Martinović as Mila Elegović

Notable music parodies

Laku noć, Hrvatska was also popular in Croatian media for numerous parodies criticising politics and pop culture through various songs. This list is composed of the most acclaimed parodies, alongside the people who were included in the renditions.

Controversy
During an 2005 interview for the weekly paper Nacional, one of the show's creators, Števo Šinik (more prominently known as Stiv Cinik) accused the director of Croatia Film, Željko Zima, of censorship and hindering the original vision of the project. He alleged Zima took control over development removing portions of the script and attempting to discourage certain practices to prevent or downplay criticism towards members of the government.

References

External links
 
 

2005 Croatian television series debuts
Croatian animated television series
Croatian comedy television series
2000s Croatian television series
2000s animated television series
Cultural depictions of Slobodan Milošević
Cultural depictions of Radovan Karadžić
Cultural depictions of Josip Broz Tito
Cultural depictions of Vladimir Putin
Cultural depictions of Winston Churchill
Cultural depictions of Osama bin Laden
Cultural depictions of Mahatma Gandhi
Cultural depictions of Croatian people
Nova TV (Croatia) original programming